Henry Fox may refer to:

 Henry Fox, 1st Baron Holland (1705–1774), British politician
 Henry Edward Fox (1755–1811), British Army general
 Henry Vassall-Fox, 3rd Baron Holland (1773–1840), English politician
 Henry Fox-Strangways, 2nd Earl of Ilchester (1747–1802), British peer and politician
 Henry Stephen Fox (1791–1846), British diplomat
 Henry Fox, 4th Baron Holland (1802–1859), British politician and ambassador
 Henry Fox (soldier) (1833–1906), German soldier who fought in the American Civil War
 Henry M. Fox (1844–1923), American Civil War soldier and Medal of Honor recipient
 Henry Fox-Strangways, 5th Earl of Ilchester (1847–1905), British peer and politician
 Henry Fox (baseball) (1873–1927), Major League Baseball player

See also

 Harry Fox (disambiguation)